Martin Winter (5 November 1955 – 21 February 1988) was a German rower who competed for East Germany in the 1980 Summer Olympics.

He was born in Zerbst in 1955. In 1980 he was a crew member of the East German boat that won the gold medal in the quadruple sculls event. He died in Magdeburg in 1988 at age 32 from the consequences of an accident.

References

External links
 

1955 births
1988 deaths
People from Zerbst
People from Bezirk Magdeburg
East German male rowers
Sportspeople from Saxony-Anhalt
Olympic rowers of East Germany
Rowers at the 1980 Summer Olympics
Olympic gold medalists for East Germany
Olympic medalists in rowing
World Rowing Championships medalists for East Germany
Medalists at the 1980 Summer Olympics
Recipients of the Patriotic Order of Merit in gold